The Mounds Recreation Area simplified as just "The Mounds" is an Off road park located in Mount Morris, Michigan. The park is owned and operated by the Genesee County Parks & Recreation Commission. The park is muddy and wooded and has many trails.

See also 
 Mud bogging
 Off-roading
 Off-road vehicle

External links 
 Official Website
 The Mounds
 Got Mud?
 We Got Mud

Parks in Michigan
Protected areas of Genesee County, Michigan